Henry Brownrigg may refer to:

 Sir Henry John Studholme Brownrigg (1882–1943), British Royal Navy officer and Commander-in-Chief of The Nore
 Henry J. Brownrigg  (1874–1945), Newfoundland merchant and politician